The following recordings and films feature music played on the hurdy-gurdy.

Australia
 There is hurdy-gurdy and border pipes on the Earthly Delights album Pleasures for Four Seasons and Favourites for Four Settings, played by John Garden.
 Canadian-born Barb Dwyer has recorded three CDs of hurdy-gurdy music while living in Australia: Riding the Wild Gurdy Gander, Hullabaloom and La Langue Sauvage.
 In the Melbourne-based, neo-classical/goth project called The Victim's Ball, hurdy-gurdies are widely featured on various tracks.
 The Australian world/fusion group Umanee features the hurdy-gurdy in many of their songs.
 The Australian folk group called "Taliesin" used hurdy-gurdy on several tracks of their eponymous album.

Austria
 Matthias Loibner has re-arranged Winterreise, Schubert's suite of 24 songs, for hurdy-gurdy and recorded it with singer Nataša Mirković-de Ro. The last song in the suite, Der Leiermann, is about a hurdy-gurdy player.

Belgium
 The folk metal band Ithilien uses hurdy-gurdy in their songs.

Canada
 The Quebecois group Ad Vielle Que Pourra prominently featured the hurdy-gurdy of member Daniele Thonon on their four albums, released between 1989 and 1996.
 Régine Chassagne, a prominent member of Canadian indie rock band Arcade Fire uses a hurdy-gurdy on their 2007 album Neon Bible. Notable tracks featuring the use of a hurdy-gurdy are "Black Mirror" and "Keep the Car Running".
 Loreena McKennitt has several albums featuring a hurdy-gurdy played by Nigel Eaton and Ben Grossman. A hurdy-gurdy is prominently featured (and shown in close-up) in several songs on the concert video/album Nights from the Alhambra.

Finland
The band Korpiklaani plays the hurdy-gurdy during the music video for Rauta.

France
 Patrick Bouffard is a master player and composer in the Bourbonnais and Auvergne traditions, and has recorded several albums with Trio Patrick Bouffard, Les Vielleux du Bourbonnais, La Chavannée de Montbel and other groups.
 Gilles Chabenat is a composer and master player of traditional and experimental electronic hurdy-gurdy styles.
 The band Dédale features Isabelle Pignol on hurdy-gurdy. 
 Jean-François Dutertre's CD Chansons de Normandie (2002) features the hurdy-gurdy.
 Alexis Vacher (Alek and Hurdy-Gurdy) mixing his electroacoustic hurdy-gurdy with his computer.
 Grégory Jolivet. 
 La Chavannée. 
 La Machine.
 French improviser Dominique Regef plays hurdy-gurdy in the Spectrum String Trio on their 2008 release Spectrum.
 The folk band Tapage includes Stéphane Durand on acoustic and electro-acoustic hurdy-gurdy; they have released two CDs: Partage Nocturne and Tapage. Stéphane Durand also recorded a duo album with Thierry Nouat: Machiavel. 
 The avant-garde band Zaar has a hurdy-gurdy player.

Germany
 The pagan folk band Faun uses hurdy-gurdy on their albums.
 The German folk-rock metal band In Extremo sometimes uses a hurdy-gurdy in their songs.
 The German folk-rock metal band Feuerschwanz sometimes uses a hurdy-gurdy in their songs.
 The German folk-rock band Schandmaul uses a hurdy-gurdy.
 The medieval metal band Saltatio Mortis makes extensive use of the hurdy-gurdy and other instruments not typically seen in metal genres.
 The pagan folk band Waldkauz write and perform songs using the hurdy-gurdy. 
 Patty Gurdy wrote and performed two tunes on the Carnival Row soundtrack.

Hungary
 Hurdy-gurdy is featured on albums As Above, So Below and Path by folk black metal artist Vvilderness.

Ireland
 Throughout his career, Andy Irvine has played the hurdy-gurdy made for him in 1972 by Peter Abnett, an English instrument maker. Several of his albums feature at least one track where he uses the instrument. For example: 
"Planxty Irwin" (released on Planxty's first album in 1973)
"Lough Erne Shore" and "Streets of Derry" (released on the Andy Irvine/Paul Brady album in 1976) 
"I Am A Youth That's Inclined To Ramble" and "Jackson And Jane" (released on Paul Brady's Welcome Here Kind Stranger album in 1978)
"The Gerriere And The Constitution" (released on the Mick Hanly's As I Went Over Blackwater album in 1980)
"Come to the Land of Sweet Liberty" and "Longford Weaver" (both released on his first solo album Rainy Sundays... Windy Dreams in 1980).

Italy

 The Italian Folk-rock band Lou Dalfin uses the hurdy-gurdy prominently in all their albums. Sergio Berardo, the founder and lead figure of the band, plays the instrument.
 The hurdy-gurdy plays a fundamental role in all albums of InChanto, a neo-folk ensemble from Tuscany active since 1998.

Japan
 Keiji Haino has recorded an album that uses the hurdy-gurdy, The 21st Century Hard-y Guide-y Man.

Latvia

Morocco
 The rock band Lazywall used a hurdy-gurdy played by Zarand Schuller as an introduction to their concerts during their tour of France in November 2007.

Netherlands
 The pagan folk band Omnia features the hurdy-gurdy on many tracks on their album Pagan Folk (2006), played by Jennifer Evans-van der Harten.

Poland
 The psychedelic stoner rock band Obiat uses a hurdy-gurdy, played by Zarand Schuller, in some of its live concerts and on its second album Disturbulence.
 Michalina Malisz, The hurdy gurdy player from the Swiss Celtic Metal band Eluveitie is from Poland and has released some hurdy gurdy covers of metal songs on Youtube and Spotify.

Spain
Germán Díaz
Marc Egea (kaulakau ...)
Óscar Fernández (Os Cempés, Bonovo ...)
Adriá Grandia
Efrén López (Evo, L'Ham de Foc ...)
Rafa Martín (La Musgaña)
Jota Martínez (Mara Aranda, Al Andaluz Project ...)
Anxo Pintos
Merce Santos, from the Asturian folk band La Bandina

Sweden
 Hurdy-gurdies are used in many of the recordings by the Swedish groups Garmarna and Hedningarna.
 In 1999, Stefan Brisland-Ferner of Garmarna and Hållbus Totte Mattson of Hedningarna began collaborating on a musical project to explore a novel use of hurdy-gurdies, based on the idea that the hurdy-gurdy was the mediaeval equivalent of a synthesizer. In 2005, they released their first album under the name Hurdy-Gurdy, titled Prototyp. The album consists of twelve traditional and original songs, played entirely on two Swedish hurdy-gurdies by Brisland-Ferner and Mattson. Specialized recording and computer editing techniques were used to produce a number of unique musical effects.

Switzerland
 The folk metal band Eluveitie uses the hurdy-gurdy in many of their songs, played first by Anna Murphy, then by Michalina Malisz.
 The hurdy-gurdy is featured in the rock band Cellar Darling whose members also joined from Eluveitie.

United Kingdom
 Ritchie Blackmore sometimes plays a hurdy-gurdy with the band Blackmore's Night, as seen on their concert DVD Paris Moon
 The group Blowzabella feature hurdy-gurdies together with bagpipes and an array of acoustic instruments "to produce an inimitable, driving drone-based sound influenced by British and European traditional dance music."
 The Broadside Band, a traditional English folk band, features a hurdy-gurdy on many of their songs.
 Nigel Eaton has recorded with Blowzabella and Bellowhead and also several solo CDs: Whirling Pope Joan (with Julie Murphy) in 1994 and The Duellists (with Cliff Stapleton and Chris Walshaw) in 1997, among others. He also plays hurdy-gurdy on No Quarter: Jimmy Page and Robert Plant Unledded, the 1994 album of Jimmy Page and Robert Plant's 1990s band Page and Plant, most notably on their new version of Nobody's Fault but Mine. 
 The album In Elven Lands by The Fellowship features a hurdy-gurdy played by Ethan James.
 Led Zeppelin guitarist Jimmy Page can be seen playing a hurdy-gurdy in the Zeppelin movie The Song Remains the Same, sitting in front of his 18th century manor at Plumpton, Sussex. The tune played is called "Autumn Lake". Page and Plant are also seen using a hurdy-gurdy in a 1994 recording of Gallows Pole.
 The multi-instrumentalist Brendan Perry is also a hurdy-gurdy virtuoso and used one in the live performance of Saltarello in the 2005 tour of his former band Dead Can Dance.
 Jem Finer plays a hurdy-gurdy on the Pogues' Misty Morning, Albert Bridge, from their album Peace and Love.
 Sting played a hurdy-gurdy accompanying Alison Krauss in the song "You Will Be My Ain True Love" from the Cold Mountain soundtrack.

United States
 Penny Cloud, from folk trio French Creek based in California, plays hurdy-gurdy on their CD Fait en Californie (1995).
 David Eugene Edwards of the band 16 Horsepower plays the hurdy-gurdy, among other instruments.
 David Miles plays hurdy-gurdy on "Low Man's Lyric", track 11 on the Metallica album ReLoad (1997).
 A hurdy-gurdy is used on two tracks of The Civil War album (2003) by experimental electronic music duo Matmos.
 Brendan O'Brien plays the hurdy-gurdy on the tracks "Empty Sky" and "Into The Fire" from the Bruce Springsteen album The Rising (2002).
 Jim O'Rourke's one track album Happy Days  features the hurdy-gurdy extensively (1997).
 The album The Raven (2003) by Lou Reed features Frank Wulff playing a hurdy-gurdy on two songs: "Overture" and "The Fall Of The House Of Usher".
 The Rose Ensemble, an early music group based in Minnesota, frequently uses the hurdy-gurdy in performances and recordings.
 The New York ensemble Unto Ashes use the hurdy-gurdy in their funerary song "Exeunt Omnia" (Exit into White, 2003), which also features dulcimer and percussion. On their 2007 album Grave Blessings, the track "Tous Esforcier" features the hurdy-gurdy used solely as a drone and accompanied by voice, French horn, and percussion.
 The hurdy-gurdy is played by Tony Berg on the track "Hang On", from Weezer's 2010 album, Hurley.
 The hurdy-gurdy is played by John C. Van Orman on the track "King of Old-Time France", from his album Love, Liquor, and the Lord (2009).
 The hurdy-gurdy is featured in the opening title sequence of the TV series Black Sails.
 Felicia Dale of the duo Pint and Dale (William Pint and Felicia Dale), a Seattle-based folk band who perform nautical and sea shanties, plays the hurdy-gurdy.
 Seattle-based pagan folk-rock band, Gaia Consort, uses a hurdy-gurdy on track "The Green" from their album Vitus Dance (2007). Their successor band, psychedelic chamber rock band Bone Poets Orchestra, also uses a hurdy-gurdy on track "Everyone" from their album Edge of the Western World (2016).
 On his album Shaking Hands With Kafka, LA musician Ethan James plays the hurdy-gurdy on nearly all tracks.
 The hurdy-gurdy is featured in the YouTube video "have you seen my laptop?" by Brian David Gilbert. 
 The hurdy-gurdy is featured on the YouTube channel "Down the Rabbit Hole" in which the entire history of the hurdy-gurdy is explained.

Multinational compilations
 There are many field recordings available, both commercially and in archives, of traditional musicians from France, Spain, Hungary, etc., playing hurdy-gurdies. Examples include the 10-CD box set Une Anthologie des Musiques Traditionnelles (2010), which has several tracks of performances on the hurdy-gurdy by traditional players, and the Spanish musician Faustino Santalices' Gravacions Historicas de Zanfona, 1927–1949.)

In films
 The movie Napoléon (1927) has a musician playing a hurdy-gurdy.
 In the movie Captains Courageous (1937), Spencer Tracy is seen playing a hurdy-gurdy.
 The movie The Night Before Christmas (1961) has a blind musician playing a hurdy-gurdy.
 Ridley Scott's first feature film, The Duellists (1977), includes a short scene with two hurdy-gurdy players in a tavern.
 The movie Monster (2003) has music by BT (Brian Wayne Transeau) that includes a hurdy-gurdy, played by Ben Grossman. It is available on CD Music From & Inspired By the Film Monster released by Digital Sound in 2004. 
 The movie The Polar Express (2004) has a hobo on top of the train playing a hurdy-gurdy.
 Composer Bear McCreary features the hurdy-gurdy in his title score for the Starz series Black Sails (2014–2017).

In Video Games 

 The video game God of War Ragnarök features the use of the hurdy-gurdy by composer Bear McCreary.

References

Music-related lists
Hurdy-gurdies